GBA-3 (Gilgit-III) is a constituency of Gilgit Baltistan Assembly currently represented by the Syed Sohail Abbas Shah of Pakistan Tehreek-e-Insaf.

Members

Election results
Aftab Haider of Pakistan Peoples Party won by 6,214 votes.

2015
Doctor Muhammad Iqbal of Pakistan Muslim League (N) won by getting 7,852 votes.

2020 
Syed Sohail Abbas Shah received 6807 votes and won his seat in the 3rd Gilgit Baltistan Assembly.

References

Gilgit-Baltistan Legislative Assembly constituencies